West Langdon is a village in the Dover district of Kent, England.  It is located five miles north of Dover town. The population of the village is included in the civil parish of Langdon.

The name Langdon derives from an Old English word meaning long hill.  The first known written reference dates to 861 AD, mentioning one Langandune, but around 1200 AD there was a reference to Estlangedoun (East Langdon, about one mile to the south east) and Westlangedone.

The Church is dedicated to Saint Mary.  The remains of Langdon Abbey are nearby.

External links

 Church notes

Villages in Kent